Nenad Cvetković (born 6 January 1996) is a Serbian footballer who plays for F.C. Ashdod.

Club career
Born in Užice, Yugoslavia, Cvetković came through the Red Star Belgrade youth system. In summer 2014, he moved on loan to Serbian League Belgrade side IM Rakovica, where he spent the first half of the season. Cvetković signed his first professional contract with Red Star in 2015. He was loaned out to Radnički Beograd for the 2015–16 season.

At the beginning of 2016, Cvetković signed with Serbian First League club Zemun.

On 27 July 2020 signed in the Israeli Premier League club F.C. Ashdod.

Career statistics

Club

References

1996 births
Living people
Sportspeople from Užice
Association football defenders
Serbian footballers
FK Rakovica players
FK Radnički Beograd players
FK Zemun players
FK Voždovac players
F.C. Ashdod players
Serbian First League players
Serbian SuperLiga players
Israeli Premier League players
Expatriate footballers in Israel
Serbian expatriate sportspeople in Israel